Oliver Marach and Fabrice Martin were the defending champions, but lost in the first round to Jonathan Erlich and Scott Lipsky.

Raven Klaasen and Rajeev Ram won the title, defeating Treat Huey and Max Mirnyi in the final, 7–5, 7–5.

Seeds

Draw

Draw

References

External links
 Main draw

Delray Beach Open - Doubles
2017 Doubles